Chris Anderson may refer to:

Sports
 Chris Anderson (baseball) (born 1992), American baseball player 
 Chris Anderson (cheese roller), 22-time winner of annual cheese rolling
 Chris Anderson (footballer, born 1925) (1925–1986), Scottish footballer
 Chris Anderson (footballer, born 1990), English footballer
 Chris Anderson (golfer) (born 1970), American professional golfer
 Chris Anderson (high jumper) (born 1968), Australian high jumper
 Chris Anderson (rugby) (born 1953), Australian rugby league player and coach, rugby union coach

Music
 Chris Anderson (trumpeter), American trumpet player, with Southside Johnny and the Asbury Jukes
 Chris Anderson (pianist) (1926–2008), American jazz pianist

Other
 Chris Anderson (entrepreneur) (born 1957), Pakistan-born British publisher, entrepreneur and head of TED 
 Chris Anderson (writer) (born 1961), American business writer, former editor-in-chief of Wired Magazine, popularized "The Long Tail"
 Chris Anderson (politician), American politician and Democratic Party political activist

See also
 Chris Andersen (born 1978), American retired basketball player
 Christopher Anderson (disambiguation)
 Christopher Andersen (born 1949), American journalist and author